The women's 1500 metres race of the 2015–16 ISU Speed Skating World Cup 2, arranged in the Utah Olympic Oval, in Salt Lake City, United States, was held on November 21, 2015.

Heather Richardson-Bergsma of the United States won the race on a new world record, while Brittany Bowe of the United States came second, also beating the old record, and Martina Sáblíková of the Czech Republic came third. Ivanie Blondin of Canada won the Division B race.

Results
The race took place on Saturday, November 21, with Division B scheduled in the morning session, at 10:48, and Division A scheduled in the afternoon session, at 16:16.

Division A

Note: WR = world record, NR = national record, NRJ = national record for juniors.

Division B

Note: NR = national record.

References

Women 1500
2
ISU